Kottayam Central Diocese is one of the 30 dioceses of the Malankara Orthodox Syrian Church. The diocese was created in 1982. This diocese is in the direct control of Catholicos of the East (Malankara Metropolitan).The current Metropolitan of the diocese is the Malankara Metropolitan H.H Baselios Marthoma Mathews 3 . The head office is located in Devalokam Aramana, Kottayam.

History

Kottayam Central Diocese was created in 1982. 

Even before the formation of the diocese , most of the churches in the diocese were directly ruled by the Malankara Metropolitan . According to the available historical documents , these churches were administered in this manner before the Mulanthuruthy Synod which held in 1876.In 1876, when seven dioceses were formed as per the decisions of the Mulanthuruthy Synod which held at 1876 headed by H.H Ignatius Peter 4 , the then Patriarch of Antioch , these churches were ruled by the then Malankara Metropolitan H.G Pulikkottil Joseph Mar Dionysius 2 . In 1958, when the both factions united , the then Malankara Metropolitan H.H Baselios Geevarghese 2 stated in his Kalpana regarding the division of the churches that these churches were and should continue to be directly ruled by the Malankara Metropolitans . 

This diocese was officially created by the partition of Kottayam Diocese in 1982. The diocese always under the control of Catholicos of the East (Malankara Metropolitan). During the time of Baselios Mar Thoma Mathews I Kottayam diocese was divided and created this diocese in 1982 April 21. The diocese was formed with parishes situated in Kottayam diocese but controlled directly by Malankara Metropolitan. Malankara Metropolitan is the Metropolitan of this diocese. The head office of this diocese is in Devalokam Aramana, head office of Malankara Orthodox Church.

Parishes

 Karapuzha Geevarghese Mar Gregorios Orthodox Church
 Kottayam St Mary's Cheria Pally Mahaidavaka
 Kottayam Mar Elia Orthodox Cathedral
 Kummanam St.George Orthodox Church
 Manganam Ebenazar Orthodox Church
 Nattassery St.Thomas Orthodox Church
 Thazathangady Mar Baselios Orthodox Church

References

External links
Website of Malankara Orthodox Church

Malankara Orthodox Syrian Church dioceses
1982 establishments in Kerala